Alejandro García-Huidobro Sanfuentes (born 19 April 1952) is a Chilean politician who served as a member of the Senate of his country.

References

External links
 

1952 births
Living people
Chilean people
21st-century Chilean politicians
Union of the Centrist Center politicians
Independent Democratic Union politicians
University of Chile alumni